The Caribbean Disaster Emergency Management Agency (CDEMA) is an inter-regional supportive network of independent emergency units throughout the Caribbean region. Formed on September 1, 2005, as the Caribbean Disaster Emergency Response Agency (CDERA) it underwent a name change to CDEMA in September 2009.

Members 
The participating member states and agencies of the CDEMA include:

Activities 

The stated role of the CDEMA is to coordinate disaster response to member countries. CDEMA personnel worked in Grenada and Jamaica in early September 2004 after the passage of Hurricane Ivan.

During the mid-1990s, CDEMA provided disaster support for the eruption of the Soufriere Hills volcano in Montserrat. The CDEMA also regularly monitors the Soufriere Hills volcano, in addition to the active undersea volcano named Kick 'em Jenny, to the north of Grenada.

Members of the Regional Security System have requested military and logistical assistance through that agreement after natural disasters as well.

Background 
The Pan-Caribbean Disasters Preparedness and Prevention Project (PCDPPP) was established in July 1984 to control and minimize the damage caused by severe weather in the Caribbean region and the Gulf of Mexico. Prior to the establishment of the PCDPPP, disasters in the area were addressed via private donors, a method that was heavily dependent on others and failed to help the countries of the Caribbean's cause for independence.
 
The PCDPPP was a collection of international sponsors such as the United States Agency for International Development (USAID), the Canadian International Development Agency, the Government of the Netherlands, and the United Nations Disaster Relief Organization (UNDRO). The PCDPPP failed to break the direct and indirect dependence the Caribbean had on Europe and the United States. Ultimately, the PCDPPP failed to achieve full participation from Caribbean countries.

In 1989, after the widespread destruction of Hurricane Hugo, there was a focus on creating more effective natural disaster management and preparedness. In 1991 the Caribbean Disaster and Emergency Response Agency (CDERA) was created. CDERA was formed with 16 participating Caribbean nations. With this organization, Caribbean countries had regional support along with international support. This increased the probability of aid coming from regional sources. CDERA would later change its name to CDEMA, the Caribbean Disaster Emergency Management Agency.

History 

In 1989, when the PCDPPP was beginning to fall apart, Hurricane Hugo struck the Caribbean. Relief was still relying on foreign aid from countries such as the United States. By 1990 the insurance companies were criticizing the PCDPPP and how it was necessary to revamp the system in which the Caribbean responded to natural disasters. The construction industry, in particular, was criticized for not enforcing enough standards on structure's abilities to withstand disasters prone to the Caribbean. In 1991 the PCDPPP ceased to exist, and for about a month, the insurance agencies in the region were desperate for a replacement. In terms of disaster relief and management, the Caribbean region was in limbo, awaiting a strong force to aid them in a time of crisis. There were little signs of funding for the formation of such an organization, and meeting the deadline of June 1, 1991, for the implementation of a new disaster relief organization was looking doubtful. Funding was and still is a huge part of this region, and in terms of disaster relief meant everything. The Caribbean Community (CARICOM) was finally able to take the initiative and set up CDERA in September 1991.

The growth of CDERA is said to have been very slow throughout the 1990s. Things began to improve starting in the twenty-first century with CDERA. In 2003 studies showed how their own developed earlier warning systems in the Caribbean straight from the Caribbean Metrological organization based in Trinidad and Tobago were reducing the lives lost in disasters. There was still controversy over whether the people had confidence in this system, and they needed to study how the public interacted with these systems for improvement.

In 2005, CDERA was planning to better coordinate with the tourism industry and get them up to speed on preparing a response strategy and a clear plan for preparing for natural or man-made disasters. CDERA was also formulating plans to train their employees better and improve the spread of information. The Caribbean Tourism Organization (CTO) claimed the current system CDERA was using needed to become more united into one system instead of a "tower of Babel" effect occurring. Also later that year CDERA coordinator, Jeremy Collymore, started putting pressure on the individual countries of the Caribbean Union to increase their preparedness plan, giving them encouragement to become more self sustainable in case of an emergency. While encouraging strengthening from within, aid from Japan was used to help develop their community early warning systems and hazard management ability. With the recent tsunamis in Thailand and Somalia aid was sought from the Pacific Tsunami Warning Center to develop earlier tsunami warning systems in the Caribbean. Although CDERA was looking outward for nations with experience in tsunamis, much studying was done on the subject within the Caribbean at places such as the University of Puerto Rico, the University of the Virgin Islands.

In 2006, financial aid from the European Commission granted 3.4 million to help prepare for disasters. CDERA was responsible for using this money where they saw fit. Financing CDERA's projects is still continuing to be greatly funded from outside sources. Even today approximately 90% of funding for CDERA's projects comes from international donors. Along with funds being heavily dependent on foreign sources staffing for CDERA has been in serious trouble. It has been said that some staff members of CDERA lack backgrounds in disaster management and those in charge are low in the bureaucracy's chain of command.

In 2010, CDERA had undergone a name change to the Caribbean Disaster Emergency Management Agency (CDEMA). CDEMA is still constantly trying to increase their effectiveness in disaster managing while keeping it sustainable within their own region. They have recently been focusing on creating a better connection with policy makers and technical officials for better results. CDEMA has evolved a lot since its creation in 1991 and taken a largely more independent role of disaster relief for the Caribbean. It provides a local response effort and management system to handle the increase of natural disaster in the recent few decades. CDEMA still largely leans on foreign aid for its financial support. CDEMA continues to grow into a strong local agency to manage and respond to disaster is the Caribbean region. These agencies however may not be effective in responding to Caribbean countries during a threat posed by a natural disaster.

See also 

 Canadian Hurricane Centre
 European Organisation for the Exploitation of Meteorological Satellites
 National Oceanic and Atmospheric Administration (NOAA)
 Caribbean Catastrophe Risk Insurance Facility Segregated Portfolio Company (CCRIF)

References

External links

.
Emergency organizations
Disaster
Non-profit organisations based in Barbados
Emergency management